Méryll Boulangeat  (born 6 September 1986) is a French freestyle skier.

She competed at the FIS Freestyle World Ski Championships 2007, where she won a silver medal in ski cross. She won a bronze medal in ski cross at the FIS Freestyle World Ski Championships 2009.

References

External links 
 

1986 births
Living people
Sportspeople from Chambéry
French female freestyle skiers
Université Savoie-Mont Blanc alumni